This is a list of cathedrals in Spain, as defined by the National Plan of Cathedrals. It includes cathedrals, co-cathedrals, and some former cathedrals. All of these temples are Roman Catholic, and cathedrals of other Christian denominations are listed separately below. A cathedral church is a Christian place of worship that is the chief church of a diocese and is distinguished as such by being the location for the cathedra or bishop's seat. As this list limits itself to temples that hold this title, some famous churches of the country are not included here, notably Barcelona's Basilica of the Sagrada Família and Santa María del Mar, the Basilica of Covadonga, the Poblet Abbey, the Hermitage of El Rocío, or El Escorial and Guadalupe Monasteries.

Andalusia and Castile and León hold the largest concentration of cathedrals of all autonomous communities, with 13 each, followed by Catalonia, with 12. Conversely, Asturias, Cantabria and the autonomous city of Ceuta have only one. Several cities have more than one building called cathedral, although one may have lost the title, such as Lleida, Salamanca, or Vitoria-Gasteiz. In many cases, ecclesiastical provincess were designated several centuries before the current borders of political provinces. As a result, some archdioceses encompass several bits of different modern autonomous communities. The largest example of this is the Archdiocese of Pamplona and Tudela, having existed continuously at least since the 9th century, now have suffragan dioceses in four different autonomous communities: Navarre, Aragón, Basque Country, and La Rioja.

Christianity arrived in the Iberian peninsula in Roman times, and some of the earliest cathedrals were built during the Visigothic Kingdom. Very few remains survive to this day, mostly as foundations of current cathedrals, as is the case with the ones in Barcelona and Palencia. Following the gradual Reconquista from the Islamic Al-Andalus, new cathedrals were erected on the site of mosques, in the Romanesque style: Santiago de Compostela, Zamora and the Old Cathedral of Salamanca are some of the best examples from this period. The mudéjar style emerged in Castile, a mixture of the Islamic and Christian architectonic traditions that also reached Aragón and whose most celebrated example would be the Teruel Cathedral. At the same time, Gothic architecture arrived from France through the Way of Saint James and influenced many of the massive cathedrals found in the north, like Burgos and León, and was quickly adopted for those further south, as new territories were retaken, like the Toledo and Seville cathedrals, the latter being the largest Gothic church in the world. A local Gothic style survived longer than in other countries, with Segovia and the New Cathedral of Salamanca being built well into the 16th century. Renaissance ideas were seen as foreign and old, but were ultimately used for, among others, the Granada Cathedral, the site of the last Islamic stronghold. By the 17th century, wealth from the Americas financed ornate Baroque architecture such as a new façade for Santiago de Compostela or the Cathedral-Basilica of Our Lady of the Pillar in Zaragoza. In post-Gothic styles, Spanish cathedrals departed from the usual Latin-cross shape and developed more open designs. A handful of Spanish cathedrals contain details of modern architecture: the Almudena Cathedral in Madrid was not finished until 1993 and is an eclectic mixture of different reinterpretations of historical styles.

Today the Spanish cathedrals are major landmarks in their cities, and draw visitors from around the world each year, contributing significantly to the country's tourism. The Santiago de Compostela Cathedral has been an important religious pilgrimage site for centuries, and in 2017 received a record 2.6 million visitors. 24 of these cathedrals have been declared UNESCO World Heritage Sites, either by themselves, like Burgos, or as part of a larger site, generally including the surrounding old town area, as is the case with San Cristóbal de La Laguna or Ibiza. Moreover, all but two of them are protected monuments of national cultural interest.

List of Roman Catholic Cathedrals 

Bold indicates seat of an archdiocese.

Former Roman Catholic Cathedrals

Anglican
The Cathedral of the Spanish Reformed Episcopal Church:
 Anglican Cathedral of the Redeemer in Madrid

Eastern Orthodox
Cathedrals of the Ecumenical Patriarchate of Constantinople:
 Cathedral of Apostle Andrew and Saint Dimitrios in Madrid

Cathedrals of the Romanian Orthodox Church:
 Romanian Orthodox Cathedral of Madrid, since 2017.

Cathedrals of the Russian Orthodox Church
 Cathedral of Saint Mary Magdalene in Madrid

See also 
 Catholic Church in Spain
 Lists of cathedrals by country
 List of the Roman Catholic dioceses of Spain

Explanatory notes

References

External links 
 

 
Spain
Cathedrals
Cathedrals